Island Gazette was a weekly newspaper covering local news, state news, obituaries, real estate statistics, and classifieds based in Carolina Beach, North Carolina. The newspaper was owned by Seaside Press Co. Inc..

References

Weekly newspapers published in North Carolina
New Hanover County, North Carolina
1978 establishments in North Carolina